Stargate Atlantis is a Canadian-American science fiction television series created by Brad Wright and Robert C. Cooper as a spin off from its sister show, Stargate SG-1. The series resumes the story of the "Lost City" and "New Order" episodes of SG-1, where a military team led by Colonel (now Brigadier General) Jack O'Neill, Dr. Daniel Jackson, Major (now Lt. Colonel) Samantha Carter and the Jaffa Teal'c, use an ancient alien artifact called the Stargate to travel to different planets to explore and find new technology. The series pilot "Rising" takes place in the year 2004 after the events of "Lost City" and "New Order", when they finally find the lost city of the Ancients.

Stargate Atlantis premiered on July 16, 2004 on the channel Sci Fi Channel. The Sci Fi Channel would air all the five seasons made for the series. Since the American broadcast splits each season to allow the production to catch up, the British and Canadian channels Sky One and The Movie Network aired the second part of some seasons before their American counterpart. Stargate Atlantis' finale episode premiered in the United States on the Sci Fi Channel on January 9, 2009. The series finale was also the series' 100th episode. All five seasons of Stargate Atlantis are available on DVD.  A direct-to-DVD film tentatively titled Stargate: Extinction was planned, but was later shelved.

The cast of the first season consisted of Joe Flanigan starring as Maj. John Sheppard, David Hewlett as Dr. Rodney McKay, Rachel Luttrell as Teyla Emmagan, Torri Higginson as Elizabeth Weir and Rainbow Sun Francks as First Lt. Aiden Ford. Aiden Ford was reduced to recurring character in season two and was replaced by Jason Momoa as the extraterrestrial human Ronon Dex in episode three of season two. Francks continued to have a recurring role in season 2, until his character's death (although this was not confirmed). After Torri Higginson's departure as a main character from Stargate Atlantis after Season 3, she was replaced by Amanda Tapping's Carter from the sister show. Paul McGillion, Robert Picardo and Jewel Staite were also main characters. McGillion became a main character in season two until season three as Carson Beckett, Picardo replaced Tapping as a main character as the new leader of the Atlantis expedition as Richard Woolsey for season five, and Staite portrayed Jennifer Keller as a main character in season five.

Series overview

Episodes in bold are continuous episodes, where the story spans over 2 or more episodes.

Episodes

Season 1 (2004–05) 

The series picks up the story arc from Stargate SG-1'''s "Lost City", where people from all around the world come together to form an expedition and discover the wonders of Atlantis. Discovering that they have been cut off from Earth, they must fend for themselves, and discover a powerful new enemy bent on human subjugation.

Season 2 (2005–06) 

The story continues when the Daedalus arrives and renews the expedition's connection to Earth. This takes place alongside the Ori story arc in SG-1, and the Wraith become an even larger threat in the Pegasus Galaxy. But what they deal with in their second year might be more than they can handle, and Dr. Carson Beckett's retrovirus is more trouble than it's worth.

Season 3 (2006–07) 

This season concentrates on more character driven stories. Along with new insight on the characters, the expedition discovers a new threat, one that could be the precursor to the Replicators. Some important characters leave the series in this season, and the fate of Atlantis once again is in the hands of the humans from Earth.

Season 4 (2007–08) 

Amanda Tapping (Col. Samantha Carter) joined the cast as a regular for 14 episodes, Jewel Staite (Dr. Jennifer Keller) became a recurring character for eight episodes, while regular cast member Torri Higginson (Dr. Weir) became a recurring cast member for four episodes. The season started September 28, 2007, airing on the SCI FI channel in the United States. In the United Kingdom, the season premiered on Tuesday, October 9, 2007 on Sky One.

Season 5 (2008–09) 

After being a regular character in season four, Amanda Tapping (Colonel Samantha Carter) became a guest star in several episodes. Robert Picardo (Richard Woolsey) joined the cast as a permanent character as Woolsey assumes command of Atlantis. Actress Jewel Staite (Dr. Jennifer Keller) was promoted from a recurring character to a permanent cast member. Michael Shanks (Dr. Daniel Jackson) and Paul McGillion (Dr. Carson Beckett) appeared as guest stars in this season, with McGillion appearing in five episodes. Actress Torri Higginson had stated that she would not be reprising her role as Dr. Elizabeth Weir in the fifth season. Rainbow Sun Francks as Aiden Ford was given a brief cameo appearance in "Search and Rescue". This was the last season of Stargate Atlantis.

 Movies 

After the August 20, 2008 announcement that Season 5 of Atlantis would be its last, it was announced the following day that the series would be continued with at least one direct-to-DVD movie. More movies were expected to follow in the Atlantis series if the first movie had been successful. However, this first project (entitled Stargate: Extinction'') was put on hold and eventually got shelved permanently in 2011.

Fan's Choice
Stargate Atlantis Fan's Choice is a Special Edition Blu-ray, released on August 9, 2009, which contained two episodes voted for by fans. The episodes chosen were the first, "Rising", and last, "Enemy at the Gate", episodes of the series. The cover artwork was also submitted by fans, with the eventual winner being William Johnson of New York City.

DVD & Blu-ray releases

See also
List of Stargate SG-1 episodes
List of Stargate Universe episodes

References

External links

 Official Stargate Atlantis site. MGM. Most of site requires Flash.
 Episode guide on IMDb.
 Episode guide on GateWorld.

Stargate Atlantis

Stargate Atlantis
Stargate Atlantis

it:Stargate Atlantis#Episodi